The Wagner Seahawks men's basketball team represents Wagner College in Staten Island, New York, United States. The school's team currently competes in the Northeast Conference. They are currently led by head coach Donald Copeland and play their home games at the Spiro Sports Center.

Postseason results

NCAA Division I Tournament results
The Seahawks have appeared in the NCAA Division I Tournament one time. Their record is 0–1.

NCAA Division II Tournament results
The Seahawks have appeared in the NCAA Division II Tournament three times. Their combined record is 3–3.

NIT results
The Seahawks have appeared in the National Invitation Tournament (NIT) four times. Their combined record is 1–4.

References

External links